Justice Buck may refer to:

Daniel Buck (judge), associate justice of the Minnesota Supreme Court
Horace R. Buck, associate justice of the Montana Supreme Court